Wendell Holmes may refer to:

Wendell Holmes (actor) (1914–1962), American actor
Wendell Holmes (1943–2015), American musician and member of the Holmes Brothers

See also 
 Oliver Wendell Holmes (disambiguation)